The 2010–11 Biathlon World Cup – Individual Women will start at Wednesday December 1, 2010 in Östersund and will finish Wednesday March 9, 2011 in Khanty-Mansiysk at Biathlon World Championships 2011 event. Defending titlist is Anna Carin Olofsson-Zidek of Sweden.

Competition format
The 15 kilometres (9.3 mi) individual race is the oldest biathlon event; the distance is skied over five laps. The biathlete shoots four times at any shooting lane, in the order of prone, standing, prone, standing, totalling 20 targets. For each missed target a fixed penalty time, usually one minute, is added to the skiing time of the biathlete. Competitors' starts are staggered, normally by 30 seconds.

2009-10 Top 3 Standings

Medal winners

Standings

References

- Individual Women, 2010-11 Biathlon World Cup
International sports competitions hosted by Sweden